Anthia decemguttata is a species of ground beetle in the subfamily Anthiinae. It was described by Carl Linnaeus in 1764.

References

Anthiinae (beetle)
Beetles described in 1764
Taxa named by Carl Linnaeus